Alexandre Comisetti (born 21 July 1973) is a former Swiss footballer. He is currently the manager of FC Echallens Région.

Club career
He played for several clubs, including Lausanne Sports, Yverdon-Sport FC, Grasshoppers Zürich, AJ Auxerre (France), Le Mans UC72 and Servette Geneva.

He played for Switzerland national football team and was a participant at the 1996 UEFA European Championship.

Coaching career
After retiring, Comisetti worked with the youth players at FC Lausanne-Sport as a kind of coordinator or advisor. He also worked as a consultant for Radio Télévision Suisse. Everything more or less started on the occasion of a Swiss-Japan, played in Austria. Alexandre Comisetti was on the set. He was so convincing that someone later asked him if he was interested in being the consultant for the Swiss team matches. From 2010, Comisetti was the manager of FC Lausanne-Sport's reserve team, better known as Team Vaud U21. From 22 October 2013 to 6 November, he was caretaker manager for the first team. He left the club at the end of the 2013/14 season.

In April 2017 it was announced, that Comisetti would be the manager of his former club FC Echallens Région from the 2017/18 season.

References

External links

1973 births
Living people
Swiss men's footballers
Swiss expatriate footballers
Switzerland international footballers
FC Lausanne-Sport players
AJ Auxerre players
Le Mans FC players
Servette FC players
Grasshopper Club Zürich players
Yverdon-Sport FC players
UEFA Euro 1996 players
Swiss Super League players
Ligue 1 players
Ligue 2 players
Expatriate footballers in France
Swiss expatriate sportspeople in France
Association football midfielders